Avalon Robbins (born July 3, 2001) is an American model and actress. She had a major role in the 2012 film The Three Stooges.

Personal life
She lives in San Diego, California. She went to Earl Warren Middle School in Solana Beach, California and attended Torrey Pines High School in Del Mar, California, graduating in 2019.

Filmography

References

External links

American child actresses
Living people
2001 births
Place of birth missing (living people)
American film actresses
American female models
21st-century American women